Melise may refer to:

Meliše, a village in Ljubno, Slovenia
Malese Jow, American actress

See also
Malise (disambiguation)
Melisa (disambiguation)